Michael "Mic" Adams (October 28, 1831 – December 24, 1903) was an American businessman and politician.

Born in Western, New York, Adams moved with his parents to Jefferson County, Wisconsin Territory in 1840. They moved to Elba, Wisconsin in 1845. In 1873, Adams started an insurance and real estate business in Columbus, Wisconsin. He served in local government offices. In 1872 and 1883, Adams served in the Wisconsin State Assembly as a Republican. He died in Columbus, Wisconsin.

References

External links

1831 births
1903 deaths
People from Oneida County, New York
People from Columbus, Wisconsin
Businesspeople from Wisconsin
Republican Party members of the Wisconsin State Assembly
People from Elba, Wisconsin
19th-century American politicians
19th-century American businesspeople